Alexander James Grant (March 25, 1829 – January 26, 1909) was a Canadian politician.

Born in Glengarry County, Upper Canada, the son of James Grant and Catherine Dingwall, Grant received his education at the schools of Glengarry County, and until twenty-six years of age, assisted his father on the farm. In 1851, he settled on a farm. Early in life, he took an active interest in municipal matters, holding the office of councilor for twenty-five years, and afterwards was elected warden. In 1874 Canadian federal election, he was nominated as an Independent candidate for the riding of Glengarry for the House of Commons of Canada, but was defeated. In 1875, was elected by a large majority for the Ontario Legislature, and during the succeeding session supported Liberal Premier of Ontario Sir Oliver Mowat, but later supported the Conservative party. He has also held the positions of vice-president and president of Glengarry County Agricultural Society, director of the Farmers' Institute of his township, also Captain of No. 1 Company of Glengarry Battalion. In religion, he was a Presbyterian and held the office of elder.

External links
 

This article incorporates text from The Canadian album: men of Canada, Vol. 4, a publication now in the public domain.

1829 births
1909 deaths
Canadian Presbyterians
Independent candidates in the 1874 Canadian federal election
Independent MPPs in Ontario
People from the United Counties of Stormont, Dundas and Glengarry